Doliops animula is a species of beetle in the family Cerambycidae. It was described by Kriesche in 1940.

References

Doliops
Beetles described in 1940